The China women's national under-18 and under-19 basketball team is a national basketball team of China and is governed by the Basketball Association of the People's Republic of China. It represents the country in international under-19 and under-18 (under age 19 and under age 18) women's basketball competitions.

See also
China women's national basketball team
China women's national under-17 basketball team
China men's national under-19 basketball team

References

under
Women's national under-19 basketball teams